The Police Gazette, established in 1772 as The Quarterly Pursuit, and later named the Public Hue and Cry and other variants, was originally a weekly newspaper produced by the Home Office and the Metropolitan Police Service. Its primary purpose was to publish notices of wanted criminals with requests for information, and where appropriate to offer rewards. In later years it became a bi-monthly publication produced by the College of Policing in London until it ceased publication in 2017.

Title
Initially titled The Quarterly Pursuit, the publication was repeatedly renamed, first to Public Hue and Cry. It became The Hue and Cry, and Police Gazette on 30 September 1797. It was renamed to Police Gazette; or, Hue and Cry on 18 January 1828. It became simply The Police Gazette on 1 April 1839.

The title Hue and Cry alludes to the historical common law process, dating back to the 13th century, whereby bystanders were summoned to assist in the apprehension of criminals.

History
The Quarterly Pursuit was first issued by John Fielding, chief magistrate of the Bow Street Police Court, in 1772. It was distributed free until 1793, when the following announcement was made:

Responsibility for its original production rested with the Home Office. Editing was delegated to the Chief Clerk to Bow Street Magistrates' Court, notably John Alexander, who edited the Gazette from 1877 until 1895. Responsibility for the Police Gazette was transferred to the Metropolitan Police ("Scotland Yard") in 1883.

In more recent years, responsibility for publication transferred to the National Police Improvement Agency (NPIA), and then eventually to the College of Policing.

Stated purpose
The purpose of the publication was stated on the front page in 1831 as follows:

Structure
Historically, The Police Gazette was published as follows:

Circulation
The Police Gazette was circulated throughout the British Isles. Since an archive survives in New South Wales, Australia, the Police Gazette may also have been circulated in countries governed by Britain around the world. However, local gazettes were printed by states in Australia (e.g., the Victoria Police Gazette, which began in 1853).

Historical value
The Police Gazette recorded the history of crime; the role of the police; and major social events such as the penal transportation of criminals to Australia. The many references to personal names – of missing persons, criminals, army deserters and those deported and imprisoned – make it an important source for genealogy when census and marriage records prove insufficient.

Cultural references
In Charles Dickens' Oliver Twist (1837–39), chapter 15, the criminal Fagin is depicted "absorbed in the interesting pages of the Hue-and-Cry".

Surviving archives
The National Police Library holds all issues of The Police Gazette from the late 18th century to 2017. As more recent issues of this publication contain restricted information, only serving UK police can access recent issues via the library. 

At least 61% of the total run of issues from 1772 to 1900 survives, archived by the initiative of local police forces, as well as by the British Library.

Many of the Supplements between 1914 and 1965 also survive.

Notes

References

External links
 National Police Library. http://www.college.police.uk/library
 Supplement A, The Police Gazette. No. 16, Friday, August 5, 1921. Vol VIII. Expert and Travelling Criminals.  http://www.londonancestor.com/misc/misc-policegaz.htm
 Issues of the Police Gazette between 1750 and 1799 are also available online at the British Newspaper Archive. http://www.britishnewspaperarchive.co.uk
 Issues of the Police Gazette & Irish Hue and Cry (12,500+ pages) between 1816 and 1929 are also available online at the Lastchancetoread. http://www.lastchancetoread.com

Magazines published in the United Kingdom
Law enforcement in the United Kingdom
Magazines established in 1772
1772 establishments in Great Britain
Home Office (United Kingdom)
Police gazettes
Magazines published in London
Bi-monthly magazines published in the United Kingdom
History of the Metropolitan Police
Magazines disestablished in 2017
2017 disestablishments in the United Kingdom
Defunct magazines published in the United Kingdom